Aptyxis syracusana, common name Syracusan spindle shell, is a species of sea snail, a marine gastropod mollusc in the family Fasciolariidae, the spindle snails, the tulip snails and their allies.

Description

Distribution
This species is native to the Mediterranean Sea and Canary Islands.

References

 Coen, G. (1922). Su talune interessanti forme di conchiglie. Rivista Italiana di Paleontologia, Parma. 28: (1–2): 21–24, pl. 2.
 Arianna Fulvo et Roberto Nistri (2005). 350 coquillages du monde entier. Delachaux et Niestlé (Paris) : 256 p.
 Russo P. (2015). On the systematic position of Murex syracusanus Linnaeus, 1758 (Gastropoda, Fasciolariidae) with revaluation of the genus Aptyxis. Bollettino Malacologico. 51(2): 79–86

External links
 Linnaeus, C. (1758). Systema Naturae per regna tria naturae, secundum classes, ordines, genera, species, cum characteribus, differentiis, synonymis, locis. Editio decima, reformata [10th revised edition], vol. 1: 824 pp. Laurentius Salvius: Holmiae
 Risso, A. (1826–1827). Histoire naturelle des principales productions de l'Europe Méridionale et particulièrement de celles des environs de Nice et des Alpes Maritimes. Paris, Levrault:. . 3(XVI): 1–480, 14 pls
 Monterosato T. A. (di) (1884). Nomenclatura generica e specifica di alcune conchiglie mediterranee. Palermo, Virzi, 152 pp
 Snyder M.A. (2003). Catalogue of the marine gastropod family Fasciolariidae. Academy of Natural Sciences. of Philadelphia, Special Publication. 21iii + 1–431

syracusana
Gastropods described in 1758
Taxa named by Carl Linnaeus